M. nigra may refer to:

Animals
 Macaca nigra, an Old World monkey species that lives in the northeast of the Indonesian island of Sulawesi (Celebes) as well as on smaller neighboring islands
 Melanitta nigra, a large sea duck species

Plants
 Morus nigra, a black colored mulberry species

See also
 Nigra (disambiguation)